Brett Dean (born 23 October 1961) is an Australian composer, violist and conductor.

Biography
Brett Dean was born, raised and educated in Brisbane. He started learning violin at the age of eight, and later studied viola with Elizabeth Morgan and John Curro at the Queensland Conservatorium, where he graduated in 1982 with the Conservatorium Medal for the highest achieving Student of the Year. In 1981 he was a prizewinner in the ABC Symphony Australia Young Performers Awards. From 1985 to 1999, Dean was a violist in the Berlin Philharmonic Orchestra. In 2000, he decided to pursue a freelance career and returned to Australia, where his many appointments have included curating classical music programs with the Sydney Festival (2005) and the Melbourne Festival (2009). As a composer and musician, he is a regularly invited guest to concert stages around the world. He was the composer-in-residence in the 2016/17 season for the National Symphony Orchestra (Taiwan). He was the Creative Chair in the 2017/2018 season for the Tonhalle-Orchester Zürich.

Dean was artistic director of the Australian National Academy of Music in Melbourne until June 2010 when his brother, Paul, took up the post.

The Melbourne Symphony Orchestra celebrated Dean's 50th birthday, and his contribution to music as composer, performer and teacher, in its 2011 Metropolis Festival.

He is married to Australian visual artist Heather Betts, and his daughter is the Australian mezzo-soprano Lotte Betts-Dean.

Works

General
Dean began composing in 1988, initially focusing on experimental film and radio projects as well as improvisational performance. Since then, he has created numerous compositions, mainly orchestral or chamber music as well as concertos for several solo instruments. His most successful work is Carlo for strings, sample and tape, inspired by the music of Carlo Gesualdo. On 7 September 2008 his work Polysomnography for wind quintet and piano received its world premiere at the Lucerne Festival; on 2 October 2008 Simon Rattle conducted the first performance of the orchestral song cycle Songs of Joy in Philadelphia. His first opera, Bliss, based on the novel by Peter Carey, premiered at Opera Australia in 2010.

Dean's compositional style is known for creating dynamic soundscapes and treating single instrumental parts with complex rhythms. He shapes musical extremes, from harsh explosions to inaudibility. Modern playing techniques are as characteristic for his style as an elaborate percussion scoring, often enriched with objects from everyday life. Much of Dean's work draws from literary, political or visual stimuli, transporting a non-musical message. Environmental problems are the subject of Water Music and Pastoral Symphony, while Vexations and Devotions deal with the absurdities of a modern society obsessed with information.

In April 2013, "The Last Days of Socrates" was premiered by the Berlin Philharmonic. The work for bass-baritone, choir, and orchestra was a co-commission of the Rundfunkchor Berlin, the Los Angeles Philharmonic and the Melbourne Symphony Orchestra.

In August 2014, "Electric Prelude" was premiered during the BBC Proms 2014 and was conducted by Sakari Oramo.

List of compositions

Stage
 One of a Kind – Ballet in three acts for solo cello and tape (1998)
 Bliss – Opera (2010)
 Hamlet – Opera in two acts (2013–16)

Orchestra
 Carlo – Music for strings, sampler and tape (1997)
 Beggars and Angels Music for orchestra (1999)
 Amphitheatre – Scene for orchestra (2000)
 Etüdenfest for string orchestra with off-stage piano (2000)
 Game over for instrumental soloists, string orchestra and electronics (2000)
 Pastoral Symphony for chamber orchestra (2000)
 Dispersal for orchestra (2001)
 Shadow Music for small orchestra (2002)
 Between Moments – Music for orchestra, in memory of Cameron Retchford (2003)
 Ceremonial for orchestra (2003)
 Moments of Bliss for orchestra (2004)
 Parteitag – Music for orchestral groups and video (2004/05)
 Short Stories – Five interludes for string orchestra (2005)
 Komarov's Fall for orchestra (2005/06)
 Testament – Music for orchestra, after version for 12 violas (2008)
 Electric Prelude (2014)

Concertos
 Ariel's Music for clarinet and orchestra (1995)
 Viola Concerto (2004)
 Water Music for saxophone quartet and chamber orchestra (2004)
 The Lost Art of Letter Writing for violin and orchestra (2006) – Winner of the 2009 Grawemeyer Award for Music Composition. Written for and first performed by Frank Peter Zimmermann in 2007. The four movements of the concerto are prefaced by four 19th century letters, written by Johannes Brahms (a love letter to Clara Schumann), Vincent van Gogh, Hugo Wolf and Ned Kelly, an Australian bushranger. Music by Brahms and Wolf is quoted in the first and third movements, respectively. The playing time of the concerto is approximately 34 minutes.
 The Siduri Dances for solo flute and string orchestra (2007)
 Dramatis personae for trumpet and orchestra (2013)
 Cello Concerto (2018)
 The Players (2018/19) for accordion and orchestra
 Gneixendorf Music – A Winter Journey for piano and orchestra (2020)

Chamber music
 Fledermaus-Overture by Johann Strauss II, arr. for octet (1988)
 Wendezeit (Homage to F.C.) for 5 violas (1988)
 some birthday... for 2 violas and cello (1992)
 Night Window – Music for clarinet, viola and piano (1993)
 Till Eulenspiegels lustige Streiche by Richard Strauss, arr. for octet (1995)
 Twelve Angry Men for 12 cellos (1996; inspired by the 1957 Sidney Lumet film 12 Angry Men)
 Voices of Angels for strings and piano (1996)
 Intimate Decisions for solo viola (1996)
 Night's Journey for 4 trombones (1997)
 One of a Kind for viola and tape (1998, 2012)
 Three Pieces for Eight Horns (1998)
 hundreds and thousands for tape (1999)
 Huntington Eulogy for cello and piano (2001)
 Testament for 12 violas (2002)
 String Quartet No. 1 Eclipse (2003)
 Three Caprichos after Goya for solo guitar (2003)
 Equality for piano (with speaking part) (2004)
 Demons for solo flute (2004)
 Prayer for piano (with speaking part) (2005)
 Recollections for ensemble (2006)
 Polysomnography – Music for piano and wind quartet (2007)
 Epitaph for string quintet (viola quintet) (2010)
 Skizzen für Siegbert (Sketches for Siegbert) for solo viola (2011)
 Electric Preludes for electric violin and ensemble (September 2012)
 String Quartet No. 2 ("And once I played Ophelia") for string quartet and soprano (2013), won Paul Lowin Song Cycle Prize
 Rooms of Elsinore for viola and piano (2016)
 Mottos, mantras and memes for string quartet (2018)
 String Quartet No. 3 Hidden Agendas (2019)
 Seven Signals for clarinet, violin, cello, and piano (2019)
 Imaginary Ballet for piano quartet (2021)

Choral
 Bell and Anti-Bell (from Parables, Lullabies and Secrets) for children's choir and small orchestra (2001)
 Katz und Spatz for eight-part mixed chorus (2002)
 Tracks and Traces: Four Songs for children's choir to texts by indigenous Australians (2002)
 Vexations and Devotions for choirs and large orchestra (2005)
 Now Comes the Dawn for mixed chorus (2007)
 Carlo Version for strings and live voices (2011)
 Concedas, Domine (a grace) for SATB chorus (2011)
 The Annunciation for chorus and ensemble (2012)
 The last days of Socrates for bass-baritone, SATB chorus, and orchestra (2013)
 In This Brief Moment for soprano, countertenor,two SATB choirs, and orchestra (2020-21)

Vocal
 Winter Songs for tenor and wind quintet (2000)
 Buy Now, Pay Later! by Tim Freedman, arr. for voice and ensemble (2002)
 Sparge la morte for solo cello, vocal consort and tape (2006)
 Poems and Prayers for mezzo-soprano and piano (2006)
 Wolf-Lieder for soprano and ensemble (2006)
 Songs of Joy (from Bliss) for baritone and orchestra (2008)
 Madame ma bonne sœur for mezzo-soprano and string quartet (2020-21)

Awards
Dean's clarinet concerto Ariel's Music won an award from the UNESCO International Rostrum of Composers in 1995. Winter Songs for tenor and wind quintet received the Paul Lowin Song Cycle Prize in 2001; Moments of Bliss for orchestra was named Best Composition at the Australian Classical Music Awards in 2005. In 2002–03, Dean was artist-in-residence with the Melbourne Symphony Orchestra and composer-in-residence at the Cheltenham Festival. In 2007–08, he became artist-in-residence with the Radio-Sinfonieorchester Stuttgart des SWR.

Dean was awarded an honorary doctorate from Griffith University in Brisbane on 21 June 2007. On 1 December 2008, he was awarded the 2009 University of Louisville Grawemeyer Award for Music Composition for his violin concerto, The Lost Art of Letter Writing. In September 2011, he was composer-in-residence at the Trondheim Chamber Music Festival.

APRA Awards (Australia) 
The APRA Awards are presented annually since 1982 by the Australasian Performing Right Association (APRA).

|-
|rowspan="3"| 2005 || Moments of Bliss (Brett Dean) ||  || 
|-
| Eclipse (Brett Dean) – Artemis Quartet || Best Performance of an Australian Composition || 
|-
| Moments of Bliss (Brett Dean) – Melbourne Symphony Orchestra || Best Performance of an Australian Composition || 
|-
| 2007 || Viola Concerto (Brett Dean) || Best Composition by an Australian Composer || 
|-
| 2008 || The Lost Art of Letter Writing (Brett Dean) – Frank Peter Zimmermann (violinist), Munich Philharmonic, Jonathan Nott (conductor) || Best Performance of an Australian Composition || 
|-
| 2012 || Sextet (Brett Dean) – Australia Ensemble || Work of the Year – Instrumental || 
|-
| 2013 || Fire Music (Brett Dean) – Adelaide Symphony Orchestra, Brett Dean (conductor) || Work of the Year – Orchestral || 
|-
| rowspan="2"| 2014 ||rowspan="2"| The Last Days of Socrates (Brett Dean, Graeme Ellis [text]) – Peter Coleman-Wright (soloist), Melbourne Symphony Orchestra and Chorus, Simone Young (conductor) || Work of the Year – Orchestral || 
|-
| Performance of the Year || 
|-
| 2015 || Dramatis Personae – Music for Trumpet and Orchestra (Brett Dean) – Håkan Hardenberger (soloist), Brett Dean (conductor), Sydney Symphony Orchestra || Orchestral Work of the Year ||

ARIA Music Awards
The ARIA Music Awards is an annual awards ceremony that recognises excellence, innovation, and achievement across all genres of Australian music. They commenced in 1987. 

! 
|-
| 2008
| Brett Dean (with Sydney Symphony Orchestra)
| Best Classical Album
| 
| 
|-

Bernard Heinze Memorial Award
The Sir Bernard Heinze Memorial Award is given to a person who has made an outstanding contribution to music in Australia.

! 
|-
| 2009 || Brett Dean || Sir Bernard Heinze Memorial Award ||  || 
|-

Don Banks Music Award
The Don Banks Music Award was established in 1984 to publicly honour a senior artist of high distinction who has made an outstanding and sustained contribution to music in Australia. It was founded by the Australia Council in honour of Don Banks, Australian composer, performer and the first chair of its music board.

|-
| 2016
| Brett Dean
| Don Banks Music Award
| 
|-

Helpmann Awards
The Helpmann Awards is an awards show, celebrating live entertainment and performing arts in Australia, presented by industry group Live Performance Australia since 2001. Note: 2020 and 2021 were cancelled due to the COVID-19 pandemic.
 

! 
|-
|rowspan="2"|  2010
| Brett Dean and (Amanda Holden – Bliss
| Helpmann Award for Best New Australian Work
| 
|rowspan="2"| 
|-
| Brett Dean  – Bliss
| Helpmann Award for Best Original Score
| 
|-

References

External links
 Australian Music Centre
 Biography, Boosey & Hawkes
 Brett Dean's Homepage with his agency, Intermusica
 Complete live performance of Brett Dean's violin concerto The Lost Art of Letter Writing by Australian violinist Sophie Rowell with Adelaide Symphony Orchestra conducted by Arvo Volmer

1961 births
Living people
APRA Award winners
Australian classical violists
Australian conductors (music)
Australian male classical composers
International Rostrum of Composers prize-winners
Musicians from Brisbane
Australian opera composers
Male opera composers
Players of the Berlin Philharmonic
People educated at Brisbane State High School
Queensland Conservatorium Griffith University alumni
21st-century conductors (music)